Yōichi Nakanishi (September 23, 1917 – February 2, 1994) was Governor of Ishikawa Prefecture (1963–1994). He was a graduate of Kyoto University and a member of the Liberal Democratic Party (Japan).

1917 births
1994 deaths
Governors of Ishikawa Prefecture
Japanese Home Ministry government officials
Kyoto University alumni
People from Kyoto
Liberal Democratic Party (Japan) politicians